John Bligh, 4th Earl of Darnley (30 June 1767 – 17 March 1831), styled Lord Clifton until 1781, lord of the Manor of Cobham, Kent, was a British peer and cricketer.

He was the son of John Bligh, 3rd Earl of Darnley, and succeeded his father as earl on the latter's death in 1781. He matriculated at Christ Church, Oxford on 16 November 1784. On 3 July 1793, he was made a DCL. He resided at Cobham Hall, near Gravesend in Kent, and was commissioned as Lieutenant-Colonel Commandant of the Chatham and Dartford Regiment of Local Militia in 1809.

John Bligh was a noted amateur cricketer who made 27 known appearances in first-class cricket matches between 1789 and 1796. He and his brother, the Honourable (later General) Edward Bligh, were staunch supporters of Kent cricket. The Bligh brothers, who originated from Athboy, County Meath, have been called "the first Irish first-class cricketers".

On 26 August 1791, he married Elizabeth Brownlow (d. 22 December 1831), daughter of William Brownlow and his second wife Catherine Hall, by whom he had seven children:
Lady Catherine Bligh (18 June 1792 – 10 January 1812)
John Bligh, Lord Clifton (22 May 1793 – 3 June 1793)
Edward Bligh, 5th Earl of Darnley (1795–1835)
Lady Mary Bligh (31 May 1796 – 18 June 1823), married her half-first cousin, Charles Brownlow, 1st Baron Lurgan on 1 June 1822 and had issue
Hon. William Bligh (17 May 1797 – 18 October 1807)
Hon. Sir John Duncan Bligh (1798–1872), a diplomat in Sweden and Hanover
Lady Elizabeth Bligh (d. 13 November 1872), married her first cousin Rev. John Brownlow on 19 July 1833 and had issue

Darnley Bay in the Northwest Territories, Canada was named for him by John Richardson.

References

External sources

1767 births
1831 deaths
John 04
Alumni of Christ Church, Oxford
Kent Militia officers
English cricketers
English cricketers of 1787 to 1825
Kent cricketers
People educated at Eton College
Irish cricketers
Marylebone Cricket Club cricketers
Fellows of the Royal Society
Gentlemen of Kent cricketers
Old Etonians cricketers
Non-international England cricketers
John 04
Barons Clifton
Hampshire and Marylebone Cricket Club cricketers